Foulonia is a genus of trilobites in the order Phacopida, that existed during the lower Ordovician in what is now France. It was described by Pribyl and Vanek in 1985, and the type species is Foulonia peregrinus, which was originally described under the genus Ceraurinella by Dean in 1966. The type locality was on Montagne Noire.

References

External links
 Foulonia at the Paleobiology Database

Phacopida genera
Fossil taxa described in 1985
Ordovician trilobites
Fossils of France
Fezouata Formation fossils
Cheiruridae